Rocky Ridge is a residential neighbourhood in the northwest quadrant of Calgary, Alberta. It is located at the western edge of the city, and is bounded to the north by Country Hills Boulevard, to the east by Rocky Ridge Road, to the south by Crowchild Trail and to the west by Twelve Mile Coulee Road.

The land was annexed to the City of Calgary in 1989 (from the Municipal District of Rocky View), and Rocky Ridge was established in 1998. It is represented in the Calgary City Council by the Ward 1 councillor.

Demographics

Residents in this community had a median household income of $84,282 in 2000, and there were 4.5% low income residents living in the neighbourhood. As of 2000, 17.3% of the residents were immigrants. All buildings were single-family detached homes, and 9.1% of the housing was used for renting.

There are many benefits of living in Rocky Ridge, such as the Rocky Ridge Ranch Centre, the community centre. Rocky Ridge is often associated with Royal Oak, the sister community.

See also
List of neighbourhoods in Calgary

References

External links
Rocky Ridge-Royal Oak Community Association

Neighbourhoods in Calgary